Sabas, ang barbaro is a 1952 Philippine historical adventure film based on Francisco V. Coching's eponymous comics series. Directed by Enrique Moreno and written by Francisco Coching, it stars Pancho Magalona and Tita Duran with Tessie Martinez.

Cast
Pancho Magalona as Sabas
Tita Duran
Tessie Martinez
Bert Olivar
Tony Cayado
Jose de Villa
Chicháy
Pedro Faustino
Totoy Torrente
Martin Marfil
Olive La Torre

External links
 

1952 films
1952 drama films
Tagalog-language films
Filipino-language films
Films set in the 19th century
Films based on Philippine comics
Films directed by Eddie Romero
Philippine drama films
Philippine black-and-white films